Osmolin  is a village in the administrative district of Gmina Sanniki, within Gostynin County, Masovian Voivodeship, in east-central Poland.

The village has a population of 570.  It is the site of the Osmolin Radio Tower.

External links
 Jewish Community in Osmolin on Virtual Shtetl

References

Osmolin